Hypaetha biramosa is a species of tiger beetle found on open sandy beaches in coastal areas across tropical Asia from India to Indonesia.

References 

Cicindelidae